The 1997 Asian Judo Championships were held in Manila, Philippines 22 November to 23 November 1997.

Medal overview

Men's events

Women's events

Medals table

References

External links
 
 Judo Union of Asia

Asian Championships
Asian Judo Championships
Asian Judo Championships
International sports competitions hosted by the Philippines
20th century in Manila
Judo competitions in the Philippines